Cardwell, a federal electoral district in the Canadian province of Ontario, was represented in the House of Commons of Canada from 1867 to 1904. Cardwell is sometimes also considered one of Ontario's historic counties, as Cardwell was listed in some post-Confederation census records as a county of residence.

Cardwell consisted of the Simcoe County townships of Adjala and Mono, and the Peel County townships of Albion (including the town of Bolton) and Caledon.

The Cardwell electoral district was abolished in 1903 when it was redistributed between Dufferin, Peel and Simcoe South ridings.

Members of Parliament

This riding elected the following members of the House of Commons of Canada:

Thomas Roberts Ferguson, Conservative - 1867-1872
John Hillyard Cameron, Conservative - 1872-1876
D'Alton McCarthy, Conservative - 1876-1878
Thomas White, Conservative - 1878-1888
Robert Smeaton White, Conservative - 1888-1895
William Stubbs, Independent Conservative - 1895-1900
Robert Johnston, Conservative - 1900-1903

Election results

|}

|}

On Mr. Cameron's death, 14 November 1876:

|}

|}

|}

On Mr. White's nomination as member of the Privy Council and as Minister of the Interior, 5 August 1885:

|}

|}

On Mr. White's death, 21 April 1888:

|}

|}

On Mr. White's resignation, October 1895:

|}

|}

|}

References

External links
Riding history from the Library of Parliament

Former counties in Ontario
Former federal electoral districts of Ontario